General Yusuf Osman "Dhumal", also known as Yusuf Hussein "Dhumaal", is a Somali military official.

Career
Dhumal hails from the Marehan sub-clan of the Rer Ahmed.

He started his career as an officer in Somalia's military. In 1988, he was transferred to the police. Dhumal was promoted to Banadir Region Police Commissioner, and later to Deputy Commissioner for National Police Operations.

On 14 May 2009, Dhumal was appointed Chief of Army of the Somali Armed Forces. He was concurrently named Brigadier General.

Dhumal was later replaced with Mohamed Gelle Kahiye on 6 December 2009.

References

Somalian military leaders
Living people
Somalian generals
Year of birth missing (living people)